Matthew James Bellamy (born 9 June 1978) is an English singer, musician, producer, and songwriter. He is primarily known as the lead vocalist, guitarist, pianist, and primary songwriter for English rock band Muse. He is recognised for his eccentric stage persona, wide tenor vocal range and musicianship. Bellamy has released solo compositions and plays bass in the supergroup the Jaded Hearts Club, also producing their debut album, You've Always Been Here (2020).

With Muse, Bellamy has won two Grammy Awards for Best Rock Album, for The Resistance (2009) and Drones (2015); two Brit Awards for Best British Live Act; five MTV Europe Music Awards; and eight NME Awards. Muse have sold over 30 million albums worldwide. In 2012, they received the Ivor Novello Award for International Achievement from the British Academy of Songwriters, Composers and Authors.

Early life
Matthew James Bellamy was born on 9 June 1978 in Cambridge, Cambridgeshire. He has an older brother named Paul. His father, George Bellamy, was the rhythm guitarist of the 1960s pop group the Tornados, whose 1962 single "Telstar" was the first US number one by an English band. His mother, Marilyn, was born in Belfast and moved to England in the 1970s. On her first day in England, she met Bellamy's father, who was working as a taxi driver in London at the time. They later moved to Cambridge and in the mid-1980s to Teignmouth, Devon. After his parents divorced, Bellamy lived with his mother and his brother. He started playing the piano at the age of six and guitar when he was 11. His first musical performance was in June 1991, aged 12, playing piano in front of his school at Teignmouth Community School.

Muse

At Teignmouth Community School, Devon, Bellamy played in a number of bands, including Carnage Mayhem and Gothic Plague with drummer Dominic Howard. When members of Gothic Plague left because of other interests, Bellamy and Howard asked bassist Chris Wolstenholme to join. In 1994, using the name Rocket Baby Dolls, they won the school's "Battle of the Bands" which led them to take the band more seriously, and changed their name to Muse.

Muse have gone on to worldwide success. Muse blends alternative, art rock, experimental rock, progressive rock, classical music, electronica and many other styles. The band is also well known for its energetic and visually dazzling live performances. On 16–17 June 2007, Muse became the first band to sell out the newly built Wembley Stadium in London.

Muse released their debut album, Showbiz, in 1999, showcasing Bellamy's falsetto and a melancholic alternative rock style. Their second album, Origin of Symmetry (2001), expanded their sound, incorporating wider instrumentation and romantic classical influences, and earned them a reputation for energetic live performances. Absolution (2003) saw further classical influence, with orchestra on tracks such as "Butterflies and Hurricanes", and became the first of seven consecutive UK number-one albums.

Black Holes and Revelations (2006) incorporated electronic and pop elements, influenced by 1980s groups such as Depeche Mode, displayed in singles such as "Supermassive Black Hole". The album brought Muse wider international success. The Resistance (2009) and The 2nd Law (2012) explored themes of government oppression and civil uprising and cemented Muse as one of the world's major stadium acts. Their seventh album, Drones (2015), was a concept album about drone warfare and returned to a harder rock sound. Their eighth album, Simulation Theory (2018), featuring a retro 1980s style, was released on 9 November 2018.

Their ninth album, Will of The People, was released on 26 August 2022, preceded by the singles, "Won't Stand Down", "Compliance", "Will of the People", and "Kill or Be Killed". 

Muse have won numerous awards, including two Grammy Awards, winning the Grammys for Best Rock Album for The Resistance and Drones, two Brit Awards, winning Best British Live Act twice, five MTV Europe Music Awards and eight NME Awards. In 2012, the band received the Ivor Novello Award for International Achievement from the British Academy of Songwriters, Composers and Authors. Muse have sold over 20 million albums worldwide.

Musicianship

Bellamy has a tenor vocal range. Many Muse songs are recognisable by Bellamy's use of vibrato, falsetto, and melismatic phrasing, influenced by Jeff Buckley. As a guitarist, Bellamy often uses the arpeggiator and pitch-shift effects to create a more "electronic" sound, citing Jimi Hendrix and Tom Morello as influences. His guitar playing is also influenced by Latin and Spanish guitar music. Bellamy has stated that he "learnt some Spanish guitar music that opened up a world of different harmonies and making music and a different sort of passion," describing it as "very heavy music, but it hasn't got a distortion pedal".

As a pianist, Bellamy often uses arpeggios. Bellamy's compositions often suggest or quote late classical and romantic era composers such as Sergei Rachmaninov (in "Space Dementia" and "Butterflies and Hurricanes"), Camille Saint-Saëns (in "I Belong to You (Mon Coeur S'ouvre À Ta Voix)"), Johann Sebastian Bach (Prelude No. 1 in C in Sunburn intro) and Frédéric Chopin (in "United States of Eurasia").

Since the early 2000s, Bellamy has worked with Manson Guitar Works, based in Devon, to create his electric guitars. They have released several "M-series" signature models. In 2019, Bellamy purchased a majority stake in Manson. In 2020, Bellamy purchased the Fender Telecaster used by Jeff Buckley for Buckley's only studio album, Grace (1994). Bellamy used it to record a song with the Jaded Hearts Club, and said he planned to use it when next recording with Muse. Bellamy often uses a Fuzz Factory, a fuzz distortion effect.

Lyrics 
Bellamy's lyrics incorporate political and dystopian themes. Books that have influenced lyrical themes in his songs include Nineteen Eighty-Four by George Orwell, Confessions of an Economic Hitman by John Perkins, Hyperspace by Michio Kaku, The 12th Planet by Zecharia Sitchin and Trance Formation of America by Cathy O'Brien.

Other work 
Bellamy co-wrote the end credits for the 2009 film The International. He wrote the song "Soaked", which appears on Adam Lambert's debut album, For Your Entertainment (2009). Bellamy appears as a playable character in the video game Guitar Hero 5, along with the song "Plug In Baby". He contributed to the second album by New Zealand artist Kimbra, The Golden Echo (2014).

Bellamy composed his first solo release, "Pray", for For the Throne, a 2019 compilation album of music inspired by the TV series Game of Thrones. In May 2020, Bellamy released his second solo song, "Tomorrow's World", inspired by life under lockdown during the COVID-19 pandemic. In June, he released an acoustic version of the 1999 Muse song "Unintended". Bellamy released a compilation of his solo work, Cryosleep, on July 16, 2021 for Record Store Day.

The Jaded Hearts Club 
In 2017, Bellamy cofounded a supergroup, the Jaded Hearts Club, to perform covers of Beatles songs. Other members include singer Miles Kane, Nine Inch Nails drummer Ilan Rubin, and drummer Sean Payne. Bellamy plays bass; he said, "It's nice being the lukewarm water in the background rather than have to be up the front there." He said of the covers: "Obviously, I know the Beatles, but I couldn't name a lot of their album tracks. It was such a different area of music to explore for me … the development of where the kind of music that ended up becoming Muse over the course of decades in terms of the evolution of rock, going back to where it first started." The band's repertoire grew to include songs by other acts. The Jaded Hearts Club released an album, You've Always Been Here, in 2020, produced by Bellamy.

Accolades
Bellamy was ranked No. 19 on Gigwise's list of The 50 Greatest Guitarists Ever. Total Guitar readers voted Bellamy No. 29 on a list of the Top 100 Guitarists of All Time. Bellamy's riff from "Plug in Baby" was No. 13 in Total Guitar's poll of the Top 100 Riffs of All Time.

In April 2005, Kerrang! magazine ranked him No. 28 in their "50 Sexiest People in Rock" poll. Cosmopolitan also chose him as the sexiest rocker of 2003 and 2004. NME Magazine voted him the "14th Greatest Rock 'n' roll Hero of all time", ahead of John Lennon and Bob Dylan. Bellamy also won the Sexiest Male Award at the 2007 NME Awards. He won again in 2009, 2010, 2011, 2013 and 2014 and was nominated in 2012. Bellamy, however, declared himself "too short to be sexy" (he is 5' 7"), and said the award should have gone to Dominic Howard, Muse's drummer. Bellamy also won the "Hero of the Year" award at the 2012 NME Awards. On 26 September 2008, the University of Plymouth awarded the members of Muse an honorary doctorate degree for their work in music.

In the January 2010 edition of Total Guitar, Bellamy was named "Guitarist of the Decade" and was proclaimed to be "the Hendrix of his generation". In the Guinness Book of World Records 2010, Bellamy is credited as holding the world record for most guitars smashed on a tour. His record, 140, was set during the Absolution Tour. In April 2010, Bellamy was named the eighth best front man of all time by the readers of Q. In December 2010, MusicRadar readers voted Bellamy the 9th greatest lead singer of all time. In 2010, a BBC Radio 6 survey named Bellamy the third-best guitarist of the last 30 years.

Political views 
Bellamy describes himself as a "left-leaning libertarian", "in the realm of Noam Chomsky". He coined the term "meta-centrism" to describe his political views in 2022, calling it "an oscillation between liberal, libertarian values for individuals ... but then more socialist on things like land ownership, nature and energy distribution". He supports the abolition of the British monarchy, the abolition of the House of Lords, decentralised government, decarbonisation, land value tax and limits on the size of corporations. In 2009, Bellamy said he had been influenced by Confessions of an Economic Hitman by John Perkins for the song "Uprising", and expressed his views that lobbyists have undue influence on politics. He said that "when people become powerful they often have a disregard for public opinion". 

Bellamy expressed interest in conspiracy theories, including the theory that the 9/11 attacks were an "inside job". However, in 2022, he described these notions as quackery and said he had abandoned them. He said conspiracy theories were attractive because they were distractions from pressing issues and that "there's a comfort that maybe human beings somewhere, even if they're evil, are in control, when in fact the truth is far more frightening – there are no humans in control and it's all a bunch of chaos". Bellamy invests in startups in Silicon Valley focusing on clean energy. He said: "That has given me optimism. When you hear their ideas and their vision for the future, it does give you genuine hope that a lot of the biggest issues we're facing could be solved." Bellamy is vaccinated against COVID-19 and supports masking during the COVID-19 pandemic.

Bellamy expressed discomfort when the lyrics of Muse's 2009 album The Resistance were adopted by the rightwing Fox News anchor Glenn Beck, and when the song "Uprising" was used in YouTube videos advocating for conspiracy theories. Muse refused requests from American politicians to use "Uprising" in their rallies. Beck responded in an open letter to Bellamy: "As uncomfortable as it might be for you, I will still play your songs loudly. To me your songs are anthems that beg for choruses of unity and pose the fundamental question facing the world today – can man rule himself?"

Personal life
Bellamy began dating the American actress Kate Hudson in mid-2010. They became engaged in April 2011. Their son, Bingham Bellamy, was born in July 2011. In December 2014, Bellamy and Hudson announced that they had ended their engagement. Bellamy mentioned applying for an Irish passport due to Brexit, as he qualifies for one through his Belfast-born mother. During a concert at Tennent's Vital 2017 in Belfast, Bellamy told the crowd that he was found to be 53% Irish following a DNA test.

In February 2017, Bellamy bought the former home of the tennis player Pete Sampras, a  estate in Brentwood, Los Angeles, for $6.9 million. As of 2022, Bellamy was living in Los Angeles during school periods to be close to his son and spending the holidays in London. In February 2015, Bellamy began dating the American model Elle Evans. They announced their engagement in December 2017 and married on 10 August 2019. Their daughter, Lovella Dawn Bellamy, was born in June 2020.

Discography 
Muse

 Showbiz (1999)
 Origin of Symmetry (2001)
 Hullabaloo Soundtrack (2002)
 Absolution (2003)
 Black Holes and Revelations (2006)
 The Resistance (2009)
 The 2nd Law (2012)
 Drones (2015)
 Simulation Theory (2018)
 Will of the People (2022)

The Jaded Hearts Club
 You've Always Been Here (2020)

Solo
 "End Title" (2009) (The International, soundtrack)
"Pray (High Valyrian)" (For the Throne, soundtrack album)
"Tomorrow's World" (2020)
"Unintended" (Acoustic version) (2020)
"Behold, the Glove" (2020)
"Simulation Theory Theme" (2020)
Cryosleep (2021)

 Guest appearances
 "90s Music" — guitar, released on The Golden Echo album by Kimbra

References

External links

1978 births
21st-century English male singers
21st-century English singers
21st-century English composers
21st-century British guitarists
Alternative rock guitarists
Alternative rock pianists
Alternative rock singers
English expatriates in the United States
English multi-instrumentalists
English people of Northern Ireland descent
English rock guitarists
English rock pianists
English rock singers
English tenors
Grammy Award winners
Lead guitarists
Left-libertarians
Living people
Muse (band) members
Musicians from Cambridgeshire
Musicians from Devon
NME Awards winners
People from Cambridge
People from Teignmouth
Progressive metal guitarists
Progressive rock guitarists
Seven-string guitarists
English male guitarists
British male pianists
English libertarians